The 2008–09 CBA season was the 14th CBA season. Guangdong Southern Tigers defended their CBA title after defeating Xinjiang Flying Tigers in the Finals, four games to one.

Tianjin Ronggang were promoted to the CBA after the team owners voted in favor of them over two other candidates, Qingdao DoubleStar and  Guangdong Fenglü. Qingdao later replaced Beijing Aoshen for their place in the CBA, when the latter failed to submit relevant files on time and lost their qualification for the season.

Foreign players of each team could play unlimited time each game, except only 5 quarters collectively when facing Bayi Rockets. The two newly promoted teams and the bottom two teams of the last season could each have one extra Asian foreign players.

Regular Season standings

Playoffs
Teams in bold advanced to the next round. The numbers to the left of each team indicate the team's seeding in regular season, and the numbers to the right indicate the number of games the team won in that round. Home court advantage belongs to the team with the better regular season record; teams enjoying the home advantage are shown in italics.

References

External links
http://sports.sina.com.cn/cba/

 
Chinese Basketball Association seasons
League
CBA